William Francis Giauque (May 12, 1895 – March 28, 1982) was a Canadian-born American chemist and Nobel laureate recognized in 1949 for his studies in the properties of matter at temperatures close to absolute zero.  He spent virtually all of his educational and professional career at the University of California, Berkeley.

Biography
William Francis Giauque was born in Niagara Falls, Ontario, on May 12, 1895.

As his parents were U.S. citizens, they returned to the U.S. where he attended public schools primarily in Michigan. Following the death of his father in 1908, the family returned to Niagara Falls, where he studied at the Niagara Falls Collegiate Institute. After graduation, he looked for work in various power plants at Niagara Falls both for financial reasons and to pursue a career in electrical engineering.  He was widely  unsuccessful.

Eventually, however, his application was accepted by the Hooker Electro-Chemical Company in Niagara Falls, New York, which led him to employment in their laboratory.  He enjoyed the work, and decided to become a chemical engineer.

After two years of employment, he entered the College of Chemistry of the University of California, Berkeley, where he received a Bachelor of Science degree with honors in 1920.  He entered graduate school at Berkeley, becoming a University Fellow (1920–1921) and a James M. Goewey Fellow (1921–1922). He received the Ph.D. degree in chemistry with a minor in physics in 1922.

Research 
Although he began university study with an interest in becoming an engineer, he soon developed an interest in research under the influence of Professor Gilbert N. Lewis. Due to his outstanding performance as a student, he became an instructor of chemistry at Berkeley in 1922 and after passing through various grades of professorship, he became a full professor of chemistry in 1934. He retired in 1962.

Absolute zero
He became interested in the third law of thermodynamics as a field of research during his experimental research for his Ph.D. research under Professor George Ernest Gibson comparing the relative entropies of glycerine crystals and glass.

The principal objective of his researches was to demonstrate through range of appropriate tests that the third law of thermodynamics is a basic natural law. In 1926, he proposed a method for observing temperatures considerably below 1 Kelvin (1 K is −457.87 °F or −272.15 °C). His work with D.P. MacDougall between 1933 and 1935 successfully employed them.

He developed a magnetic refrigeration device of his own design in order to achieve this outcome, getting closer to absolute zero than many scientists had thought possible. This trailblazing work, apart from proving one of the fundamental laws of nature led to stronger steel, better gasoline and more efficient processes in a range of industries.

His research and that of his students included a large number of entropy determinations from low temperature measurements, particularly on condensed gases. The entropies and other thermodynamic properties of many gases were also determined from quantum statistics and molecular energy levels available from band spectra as well as other sources.

His correlated investigations of the entropy of oxygen with Dr. Herrick L. Johnston, led to the discovery of oxygen isotopes 17 and 18 in the Earth's atmosphere and showed that physicists and chemists had been using different scales of atomic weight for years without recognising it.

Personal life
In 1932, Giauque married Dr. Muriel Frances Ashley and they had two sons. He died on March 28, 1982, in Berkeley, California.

Notes

References

External links
 National Academy of Sciences biography
  including the Nobel Lecture on December 12, 1949 Some Consequences of Low Temperature Research in Chemical Thermodynamics
 .
 

1895 births
1982 deaths
American physical chemists
American Nobel laureates
Canadian Nobel laureates
Nobel laureates in Chemistry
People from Niagara Falls, Ontario
University of California, Berkeley alumni
UC Berkeley College of Chemistry faculty
Canadian emigrants to the United States